Joshua David Wolf (born September 1, 2000) is an American professional baseball pitcher for the Cleveland Guardians organization and the Israeli national baseball team.

Early life and amateur career
Wolf was born in Bellaire, Texas, and is Jewish.  He had his Bar Mitzvah at the Western Wall in Jerusalem, and was a member of Congregation Beth Israel in Houston. His mother is from Israel and his father is from Cincinnati.  

Wolf attended St. Thomas High School in Houston, Texas. Wolf played for the school's baseball team and was twice named All-State. As a junior he was 4-1 with a 1.06 earned run average (ERA), and 53 strikeouts in 39 innings. In his senior year, he struck out 126 batters in 69 innings, had a 1.52 ERA, and was named Outstanding Male High School Athlete of the Year by the Jewish Sports Heritage Association. He committed to attend Texas A&M University.

Professional career
The New York Mets selected Wolf in the second round, with the 53rd overall selection, of the 2019 MLB draft. He was ranked the 36th-best prospect by MLB.com, and the 55th-best prospect by Baseball America.  At the time of the draft, he could throw a 97 mph fastball, and had a plus curveball. He signed with the Mets for a $2.15 million signing bonus, forgoing his commitment to Texas A&M. He made his professional debut in 2019 with the Rookie-level Gulf Coast League Mets, going 0–1 with a 3.38 earned run average over eight innings, in which he struck out 12 batters and walked one batter.
 
On January 7, 2021, the Mets traded Wolf, Amed Rosario, Andrés Giménez, and Isaiah Greene to the Cleveland Indians for Francisco Lindor and Carlos Carrasco. At the time, Wolf was the number 9 prospect in the Mets system. Indians president of baseball operations Chris Antonetti said: “He's a young, hard-throwing right-handed pitcher with a good mix of pitches. He's got an above-average fastball, up to 96 [mph]. He's got a really good slider. His changeup is his third pitch, and that's developing. He has the ingredients to develop into a successful starting Major League pitcher.”

For the 2021 season, Wolf was assigned to the Lynchburg Hillcats of the Low-A East. Over 18 games (17 starts), Wolf went 1–3 with a 5.35 ERA, striking out 67 batters over  innings. He split 2022 between the ACL Guardians and Lynchburg, and was 2-2 with a 5.61 ERA, striking out 25 batters in 25.2 innings.

Wolf will pitch for the Israeli national baseball team in the 2023 World Baseball Classic, to be held in Miami starting during March 11–15.

References

External links

2000 births
Living people
Baseball pitchers
Baseball players from Texas
Gulf Coast Mets players
Jewish American baseball players
People from Bellaire, Texas
Sportspeople from Harris County, Texas
2023 World Baseball Classic players
21st-century American Jews